The National Committee of the Chinese Aviation Workers’ Union is a national industrial union of the All-China Federation of Trade Unions in the People's Republic of China.

External links
 basic info from the ACFTU

National industrial unions (China)
Aviation trade unions
Transport trade unions in China